Roman Kukharskyi (born March 5, 1995) is a Ukrainian footballer playing with SV 90 Altengottern.

Career 
Kukharskyi signed with FC Sevastopol in 2012, but primarily played with the FC Sevastopol-2 reserve team in the Ukrainian Second League. In 2015, he played in the Ukrainian First League with FC Nyva Ternopil. He later played in the Ukrainian Amateur Football Championship with FC Sambir, and played abroad in Austria in 2016 with ASKÖ Bruck-Peuerbach. He returned to play in the Ukrainian First League in 2017 with FC Ternopil. In late 2017, he played in the Crimean Premier League with FC TSK Simferopol.

The following season he played abroad once more in the Landesliga with SV 90 Altengottern. In 2020, he played in the Canadian Soccer League with FC Ukraine United. In his debut season with Ukraine United he featured in the CSL Championship final against Scarborough SC. In 2020, he returned to play with SV 90 Altengottern.

References  

1995 births
Living people
Ukrainian footballers
FC Sevastopol-2 players
FC Nyva Ternopil players
FC Sambir players
FC Ternopil players
FC TSK Simferopol players
FC Ukraine United players
Ukrainian First League players
Ukrainian Second League players
Canadian Soccer League (1998–present) players
Sportspeople from Ternopil
Crimean Premier League players
Association football midfielders